The 1998 PBA Centennial Cup was a special tournament held by the PBA during the season. The event was a reference to the Philippines celebration in the Centennial year of the country's independence.

The Mobiline Phone Pals won the tournament over Formula Shell Zoom Masters in the one-game championship.

Imports

Elimination round

Bracket

Semifinals

Third place playoff

Championship

References

Centennial Cup
Centennial Cup